The men's double trap event at the 2018 Asian Games in Palembang, Indonesia took place on 23 August at the Jakabaring International Shooting Range.

Schedule
All times are Western Indonesia Time (UTC+07:00)

Records

Results
Legend
DNS — Did not start

Qualification

Final

References

Results

External links
Schedule

Men's double trap